Toshikatsu is a masculine Japanese given name.

Possible writings
Toshikatsu can be written using different combinations of kanji characters. Some examples:

敏克, "agile, overcome"
敏勝, "agile, victory"
敏活, "agile, alive"
俊克, "talented, overcome"
俊勝, "talented, victory"
俊活, "talented, alive"
利克, "benefit, overcome"
利勝, "benefit, victory"
利活, "benefit, alive"
年克, "year, overcome"
年勝, "year, victory"
寿克, "long life, overcome"
寿勝, "long life, victory"

The name can also be written in hiragana としかつ or katakana トシカツ.

Notable people with the name
Toshikatsu Doi (土井 利勝, 1573–1644), Japanese daimyō.
Toshikatsu Iwami (石見 利勝, born 1941), Japanese politician.
Toshikatsu Matsuoka (松岡 利勝, 1945–2007), Japanese politician.
Toshikatsu Nanbu (南部 利雄, 1724–1780), Japanese samurai and daimyō.
Toshikatsu Yamamoto (山元 敏勝, born 1929), Japanese physician.

Japanese masculine given names